The  is a temple of the Sōtō school in Shimonoseki, Yamaguchi Prefecture, Japan. 
It was first established as a temple of the Rinzai school by Kyoan Genjaku in 1327.

Kōzan-ji's Butsuden, completed in 1320, is a National Treasure of Japan. 
It is the oldest building designed in the Zenshūyō style that exists in Japan.

The Chūgoku 33 Kannon Pilgrimage No.19.

Building list 
Butsuden - National Treasure of Japan. It was built in 1320.
Sanmon - It was rebuilt in 1773.
Shoin
Hattō
Kyōzō - It was rebuilt in 1799.

See also 
National Treasures of Japan
List of National Treasures of Japan (temples)

External links 

 Official Site (Japanese)

1327 establishments in Asia
National Treasures of Japan
Rinzai school
Buddhist temples in Yamaguchi Prefecture
1320s establishments in Japan